is a 2019 Japanese-British historical action adventure film directed by Bernard Rose and starring Takeru Satoh, Nana Komatsu and Mirai Moriyama.  It is based on the 2014 novel The Marathon Samurai: Five Tales of Japan’s First Marathon by Akihiro Dobashi, itself inspired by the origin story of the Ansei Toashi 30-km footrace held annually in Annaka City.

Cast

Takeru Satoh as Karasawa Jinnai
Nana Komatsu as Princess Yuki
Mirai Moriyama as Tsujimura Heikurō
Shōta Sometani as Uesugi Hironoshin
Munetaka Aoki as Ueki Yoshikuni
Ryu Kohata
Yuta Koseki
Motoki Fukami
Shinsuke Katō
Joey Iwanaga
Ruka Wakabayashi
Mariko Tsutsui
Mugi Kadowaki
Nao
Junko Abe
Taishi Nakagawa
Naoto Takenaka as Kurita Mataemon
Danny Huston as Commodore Perry
Etsushi Toyokawa as Ioki Suketora
Hiroki Hasegawa as Itakura Katsuakira

Release
The film was released in theaters in Japan in February 2019.  It was later featured at the Edinburgh International Film Festival in June 2019.  Well Go USA Entertainment acquired North American distribution rights to the film in July 2019.  The film was released on VOD and digital platforms in May 2020.  It was also released on DVD and Blu-Ray in the United States on July 21, 2020.

Reception
The film has  rating on Rotten Tomatoes.  James Hadfield of The Japan Times awarded the film three stars out of five.

References

External links
 
 

2010s Japanese-language films
Japanese action adventure films
British action adventure films
2010s action adventure films
2019 action films
Films scored by Philip Glass
Films directed by Bernard Rose (director)
Films produced by Jeremy Thomas
Films based on Japanese novels
Films set in Bakumatsu
2010s English-language films
2010s British films
2010s Japanese films